Major Philippa "Pip" Joan Angel Tattersall is a Scottish soldier, born 1975 in Tarland, Aberdeenshire. She is the first woman to succeed in the 9-week All Arms Commando Course, joining the main manoeuvre formation, 3 Commando Brigade.

Tattersall successfully completed the course in May 2002 after two previous failed attempts. She serves in the Educational and Training Services Branch of the Adjutant General's Corps.

Tattersall swam the English Channel in 2006 and won a silver medal in the 2009 British Snowboarding championships.

References

Women in 21st-century warfare
Women in the British Army
1975 births
Living people
Scottish military personnel
People from Marr
Royal Army Educational Corps officers
People educated at Roedean School, East Sussex
English Channel swimmers
Scottish female snowboarders
British Army Commandos officers
Military personnel from Aberdeenshire
21st-century British Army personnel